The St. Helena Public Cemetery, at 2461 Spring St. in St. Helena, California, was listed on the National Register of Historic Places in 2018.

It is about one mile west of downtown St. Helena.  It was established in 1856 by the Hudson family as a private burial ground, with the burial of Sarah Hudson.  It has been expanded since, including by acquisition of land in 1973, and continues as a public cemetery in 2018.

References

National Register of Historic Places in Napa County, California
Cemeteries in Napa County, California